Sharena Gunawan, better known by the stage name Sharena (born 11 October 1983), is an Indonesian actress and model. Divorced since 2010, she's remarried in December 2013 with the Indonesian actor, Ryan Delon Situmeang.

Filmography

Film

Television

Awards and nominations

External links
  Profil Sharena Gunawan Kapanlagi.com

References

1983 births
Living people
Indonesian actresses
Indonesian female models
Citra Award winners
21st-century Indonesian actresses
People from Jakarta
Indonesian former Muslims
Indonesian Christians
Converts to Protestantism
Converts to Protestantism from Islam